Chodavaram is a village in Krishna district of Indian state of Andhra Pradesh. It is located in Nagayalanka mandal of Machilipatnam revenue division.

Geography
. It has an average elevation of 10 metres (36 ft).

References

Villages in Krishna district